Bear City Roller Derby (BCRD) is a flat track roller derby league based in Berlin. Founded in 2008, Bear City is a member of the Women's Flat Track Derby Association (WFTDA).

History
The league was founded as the Berlin Bombshells, although it now reserves that name for its interleague bouting team.  It was the second roller derby league in Germany, and was assisted in its early development by the first league, the Stuttgart Valley Rollergirlz.  In its early days, it was thrown out of its practice hall by Berlin's sports department; the team decided to take legal action to regain access to a public practice space.  The league was given a boost when Diane Rott transferred from the B.ay A.rea D.erby Girls.

It competed in the first roller derby bout between two German leagues, against the Stuttgart Valley Rollergirlz in 2009.  In the same year, it competed in "Roll Britannia", the first roller derby tournament in Europe, while in December it hosted the first European Roller Derby Organisational Conference (EROC).

Bear City hosted the first German Roller Derby Championship, held in December 2010, losing 124-128 to Stuttgart in the final.

In July 2016, the league announced it had officially changed the name of the organization to Bear City Roller Derby.

WFTDA competition

In October 2010, the league was accepted as an apprentice member of the WFTDA. By May 2011, it had more than 60 skaters.

In March 2012, Bear City Roller Derby became the WFTDA’s first full member league in continental Europe.

In 2014, Bear City competed at the WFTDA Division 2 Playoffs in Kitchener-Waterloo, Ontario, where they placed second to Rideau Valley Roller Girls. This playoff appearance was the first in WFTDA history by a team from continental Europe. Later that year they made their debut at the 2014 WFTDA Championships, where they placed third in Division 2. In 2015, Bear City returned to Division 2 Playoffs in Detroit, entering as the tenth seed and finishing in sixth place. In 2016 Bear City again qualified for Division 2 Playoffs as the eighth seed in Lansing, Michigan, and finished in fifth place with a 177-153 victory over Tri-City Roller Derby.

Bear City again qualified for the Division 2 Playoffs and Championship in 2017 as the #14 seed in Pittsburgh, losing their opening game to Paris Rollergirls 205-152. Bear City rebounded with a 275-253 win in overtime against Pirate City Rollers, followed by a 207-187 loss to E-Ville Roller Derby. On day 3 Bear City fell 176-155 to Ohio Roller Derby to finish in tenth place. At the 2018 WFTDA Playoffs in Atlanta, Bear City was the twelfth seed and ended their weekend with a tight consolation round victory over Queen City Roller Girls, 218-212.

Rankings

 CR = consolation round

References

External links 
 
 
 

Roller derby leagues in Germany
Sport in Berlin
Roller derby leagues established in 2008
Women's Flat Track Derby Association Division 2
2008 establishments in Germany
Women in Berlin